Annihilation of Civilization is the debut album from Evildead, a thrash metal band originating from California. It was released in September 1989 on Steamhammer Records, and was preceded by the EP Rise Above, released some months earlier. The album and the single "Annihilation of Civilization" earned Evildead widespread recognition in large part due to airplay of the single's video on MTV's Headbangers Ball.

Annihilation of Civilization was the only Evildead album for 31 years to feature Albert Gonzales on guitar and Rob Alaniz on drums. The lineup that recorded this album (except bassist Mel Sanchez, who was replaced by Karlos Medina) would be reunited for their third album United States of Anarchy (2020).

Track listing
All songs written and arranged by Evildead.
"F.C.I./The Awakening"	– 3:22
"Annihilation of Civilization"	– 4:17
"Living Good" – 5:33
"Future Shock"	– 5:39
"Holy Trials" – 5:39
"Gone Shooting" – 4:47
"Parricide" – 4:23
"Unauthorized Exploitation" – 3:21
"B.O.H.I.C.A."	– 1:56
"Rise Above" (Black Flag cover) - 3:33
"Slow-Death" - 3:26
"Run Again" - 4:02

 "F.C.I. / The Awakening" contains an audio excerpt from the horror film The Evil Dead, the film from which the band took their name.
 "B.O.H.I.C.A." is a CD bonus track and did not appear on the vinyl release.
 The last three tracks, which are from the Rise Above EP, were featured as bonus tracks on the 2004 reissue.

Credits
 Phil Flores – vocals
 Albert Gonzales – guitar
 Juan Garcia – guitar
 Mel Sanchez - bass
 Rob Alaniz – drums
 Ed Repka - Cover Art

References

Evildead albums
1989 debut albums
Albums with cover art by Ed Repka
SPV/Steamhammer albums